Sutarkhali Union is a union parishad of Dacope Upazila in Khulna District of Bangladesh.

Geography
The area of Sutarkhali Union is 50 square kilometers.

Educational institutions

Secondary school
 Dakshin Gunari Secondary School
 Kalabagi Sundarban Secondary School
 Nalian Secondary School
 Guarnari Shital Chandra Secondary School
 Sutarkhali Secondary School

Primary school
 50 No. Gunari Hari Mohan Government Primary School
 Nalian Forest Government Primary School
 Dakshin Gunari Upen Nagar Government Primary School
 Sutarkhali Bainpara Mothernagar Government Primary School
 Purba Gunari Adarsha Government Primary School
 Sutarkhali 1 No. Government Primary School

References

Unions of Dacope Upazila
Populated places in Khulna Division
Populated places in Khulna District